Barnett Township is the name of some places in the U.S. state of Pennsylvania:
Barnett Township, Forest County, Pennsylvania
Barnett Township, Jefferson County, Pennsylvania

Pennsylvania township disambiguation pages